Eravu  is a village in Thrissur district in the state of Kerala, India.  Eravu village comes under Armiboor Panchayat. St. Theresa's Ship Church is located in the village.

Demographics
 India census, Eravu had a population of 6,188 with 2,980 males and 3,208 females.

References

Villages in Thrissur district